Hyobanche are a genus of flowering plants in the broomrape family Orobanchaceae, native to southern Africa. They are root parasites that cannot perform photosynthesis, and are only observed above ground when flowering.

Species
Currently accepted species include:
 
Hyobanche atropurpurea Bolus
Hyobanche fulleri E.Phillips
Hyobanche hanekomii A.Wolfe
Hyobanche robusta Schönland
Hyobanche rubra N.E.Br.
Hyobanche sanguinea L.
Hyobanche thinophila A.Wolfe

References

Orobanchaceae
Orobanchaceae genera